Agnetina annulipes, the southern stone, is a species of common stonefly in the family Perlidae. It is found in North America.

References

Further reading

 
 
 
 
 
 
 

Perlidae
Articles created by Qbugbot
Insects described in 1861

In Argentina children often use the small insect as a gesture of gratitude to the opposite gender as a proposal to courtship, the children refer to the Agnetina annulipes as the la cucaracha del amor (The roach of love)